Maanga is a 2015 Indian Tamil language science fiction comedy film directed by debutant RS Raja and produced by Sakthivel. The film features Premji and Advaitha in the lead roles, while Leema Babu and Srinivasan appear in supporting roles.
The music was composed by Premgi amaren. It was released on 11 September 2015.

Cast
 Premji as Shiva / Vishwanatha Moorthy
 Advaitha as Joshita
 Leema Babu as Alamu
 Ilavarasu as Nambirajan
 Manobala as Rengasamy Nagarajan
 T. P. Gajendran as Petthiah
 Rekha as Samyuktha
 Srinivasan
Chaams as Kalakkal 
Thennavan

Production
The film was launched at an event in Chennai in March 2013, with Premgi Amaren reported to play a dual role in the film apart from composing the film's songs. He revealed it would be the first film which would feature him as the sole lead actor after previous ventures including 2010 Bhagyaraj had failed to be completed. Filming began later that month with Thambi Ramaiah and Manobala filming scenes in Chennai. Advaitha was selected to play the film's heroine while Leema Babu will also play a role.

Soundtrack

The soundtrack was composed by Premgi Amaren. The audio was released on 1 April 2015.

Critical reception
Indiaglitz wrote "Debutante director R.S. Raja has tried to present "Maanga" as a film with loads of fun and horror elements though the film cannot be fixed under the "Horror-comedy" genre. The film also apparently aims to be considered as a science fiction but everything related to the scientific invention of the lead character is presented in a funny way. So one could not be clear whether the intention of such scenes was dealing with science or making us laugh". The Times of India wrote "The film feels like a hodgepodge of movie references, bad science, and lazily written jokes put together in a manner that is hardly competent".

References

External links
 

2015 films
2010s Tamil-language films
Indian science fiction comedy films
2010s science fiction comedy films
2015 directorial debut films
2015 comedy films
Films scored by Premgi Amaren